The following highways are numbered 492:

Japan
 Japan National Route 492

United States
  Florida State Road 492
  Louisiana Highway 492
  County Road 492 (Marquette County, Michigan)
  Mississippi Highway 492
  Pennsylvania Route 492
  Puerto Rico Highway 492